Prof. Syed Nurul Hasan College, established in 1994, is a general degree college in the Murshidabad district of West Bengal in eastern India. It offers undergraduate courses in arts and sciences, and is affiliated with the  University of Kalyani which is also located in West Bengal.   

The campus is situated on ten acres alongside National Highway 34, in the town of Farakka.  The college's president is Md. Isfaque Hossain.

Named for Professor Hasan
This college is named after Professor Saiyid Nurul Hasan, a former Governor of West Bengal (1986–89; 1990–93) and a Union Minister of State (Independent Charges) of Education, Social Welfare and Culture, Government of India (1972–77).  “Saiyid" is an honorific prefix that can be spelled in various ways including "Syed."  Hassan died in 1993, the year before this college was established.

Departments
The college has several departments including Departments of Bengali, English, Political Science, History, Education, Geography, Economics, Mathematics, Sociology, Computer Science, Arabic, and Physical Education.

Accreditation
The college is recognized by the University Grants Commission (UGC).

See also

References

External links
Prof. Syed Nurul Hasan College
University of Kalyani
University Grants Commission
National Assessment and Accreditation Council

Universities and colleges in Murshidabad district
Colleges affiliated to University of Kalyani
Educational institutions established in 1994
1994 establishments in West Bengal